Yaroslavsky District  is an administrative and municipal district (raion), one of the seventeen in Yaroslavl Oblast, Russia. It is located in the east of the oblast. Its administrative center is the city of Yaroslavl (which is not administratively a part of the district). Population: 52,328 (2010 Census);

Administrative and municipal status
Within the framework of administrative divisions, Yaroslavsky District is one of the seventeen in the oblast. The city of Yaroslavl serves as its administrative center, despite being incorporated separately as a city of oblast significance—an administrative unit with the status equal to that of the districts.

As a municipal division, the district is incorporated as Yaroslavsky Municipal District. The city of oblast significance of Yaroslavl is incorporated separately from the district as Yaroslavl Urban Okrug.

References

Notes

Sources



Districts of Yaroslavl Oblast